Prochlorophyta is a group of photosynthetic bacteria, an important component of picoplankton. These oligotrophic organisms are abundant in nutrient poor tropical waters and use a unique photosynthetic pigment, divinyl-chlorophyll, to absorb light and acquire energy. Prochlorophyta lack red and blue phycobilin pigments and have stacked thylakoids, making them distinctly different from Cyanobacteria (or Cyanophyta), but some authors consider them as part of the Cyanobacteria, as the group Prochlorales.

Discovery and naming 
This unique group of phytoplankton, with no phycobilin pigments, were initially found in 1975 near the Great Barrier Reef and off the coast of Mexico (Prochloron). Prochlorophyta was soon assigned as a new algal sub-class in 1976 by Ralph A. Lewin of the Scripps Institution of Oceanography. Other phytoplankton that lacked phycobilin pigments were later found in freshwater lakes in the Netherlands by Tineke Burger-Wiersma and colleagues and were termed Prochlorothrix (additional reading on Prochlorothrix can be found in a journal article by A.V. Pinevich  ). In 1986 Prochlorococcus was found by Sallie W. (Penny) Chisholm and colleagues. Prochlorococcus may be responsible for a significant portion of the global primary production.

Morphology 
Prochlorophytes are very small microbes generally between 0.2 and 2 µm (photosynthetic picoplankton). They morphologically resemble Cyanobacteria (formally known as Blue Green Algae). Members of Prochlorophyta have been found as coccoid (spherical) (Coccus) shaped, as in Prochlorococcus, and as filaments, as in Prochlorothrix.

See also 
Cyanobacteria
Prochloron
Prochlorococcus
Photosynthetic picoplankton

References

External links 
 Prochlorophytes

Cyanobacteria